The Upper Tamarack River is a  tributary of the St. Croix River in Wisconsin and Minnesota, United States.  The Lower Tamarack River is a separate stream also flowing into the St. Croix River several miles downstream from the mouth of the Upper Tamarack River.

See also
List of rivers of Minnesota
List of longest streams of Minnesota
List of rivers of Wisconsin
Tamarack River (disambiguation)

References

External links
Minnesota Watersheds
USGS Hydrologic Unit Map - State of Minnesota (1974)

Rivers of Minnesota
Rivers of Wisconsin
Tributaries of the St. Croix River (Wisconsin–Minnesota)